Li Chunjiang (born 11 March 1963) is a Chinese basketball coach and former player. He was the member of national team and won titles at 1990 Asian Games and the 1991 ABC Championship. In the following year, Li along with the national team competed in the men's tournament at the 1992 Summer Olympics in Barcelona. Three years after announcing his retirement from professional basketball in 1998, he has since launched a distinguished coaching career.

Early life
Li was born on 11 March 1963 in Shenyang, the capital of Liaoning province in Northeast China. He began his basketball career in 1977 when entered Liaoning Sports School for training. He subsequently entered the Liaoning Youth Yeam at the age of 17. He was then selected into the national youth team in 1982 and the Liaoning team in 1983, where he became the small forward. Because there was no professional league before 1995, the players retired relatively early. Li Chunjiang himself was forced to retire from Liaoning in 1993 and worked in the real estate bureau of Huanggu District, Shenyang. At this time, Li resolutely gave up his working and went south to join Guangdong Hongyuan, where he played his second spring of career.

Coaching career

Dormancy period (2001–2002)
In the first year of Li Chunjiang's coaching, the team has suffered a rare five consecutive losses, which is undoubtedly a big blow for Li. The final result of Guangdong Southern Tigers in the regular season was 12–10, and the first round of the playoffs was out. In the subsequent competition of the 9th National Games in 2001, as the host, the original goal was to enter the top three Guangdong men's basketball team, and finally only won the fourth place. In the 2001-02 season, Hongyuan finished seventh in the regular season, and was swept by the Shanghai Sharks with Yao Ming in Playoffs.

Rising period (2002–2006)
In 2002–03 season, Guangdong Southern Tigers entered the stage of blowout. In the regular season, he entered the playoffs with 23–3–no.1, but lost the championship in the finals. In the 2003–04 season, Guangdong finally won the championship by defeating the old opponent Bayi in the finals. Li Chunjiang stood at the top of the CBA stage and opened the prelude of Hongyuan Dynasty.

In the 2004–05 season finals against Jiangsu, Guangdong was 1–2 behind in the first three games, especially Nanjing in the fifth game. They miraculously turned back the defeat to win the championship after 16 points in the fourth quarter. Li Chunjiang's on-the-spot command ability at critical moments is admirable. In the 2005–06 season, Guangdong won 4–1 in the finals over the old opponent Bayi Rockets, ushering in the team's first three consecutive titles. At the same time, Yi Jianlian decided to participate in the 2007 NBA draft.

Charging period (2006–2007)
In 2006, Li handed his position of head coach to Assistant coach Li Qun and traveled alone to the United States for further athletic study.
Li Chunjiang's study abroad was not gilded, but he watched the game video day and night; he drove around the west coast of the United States alone, traveling among Seattle SuperSonics, Portland Trail Blazers and Sacramento Kings; he watched the NCAA at Oregon State University and Oregon University and asked the University coaches for advice.

Brilliant period (2008–2011)
At the beginning of the 2007–08 season, Li Chunjiang returned to the position of head coach of Guangdong Southern Tigers. From the 2007–08 season, Guangdong began to rule the CBA for four years. They defeated Liaoning Flying Leopards (4–1), beat Xinjiang Flying Tigers (4–1, 4–1, 4–2) three times in a row, and won four consecutive titles, which opened the Guangdong Dynasty. At the 2008 Summer Olympics in Beijing, five trainees of Li Chunjiang were represented in the Chinese men's basketball team. In the 11th National Games of China, Guangdong men's basketball team successively defeated Shandong, which won the titles of the National Games.Coach Li also became the most successful basketball coach in China.

New challenges (2013–present)
After being eliminated by Beijing, which lead by Stephon Marbury, Li Chunjiang chose to resign. A few months later, Li Chunjiang took over Zhejiang Lions and led the team to the 2018 CBA Finals and finished as runner-up.  In November, 18-year-old Li Jinglong, son of Coach Li, also made his CBA debut with 2 points and one rebound in nine minutes.

References

External links
 

1963 births
Living people
Chinese men's basketball players
1990 FIBA World Championship players
Olympic basketball players of China
Basketball players at the 1992 Summer Olympics
Place of birth missing (living people)
Asian Games medalists in basketball
Asian Games gold medalists for China
Basketball players at the 1990 Asian Games
Medalists at the 1990 Asian Games